The UK Singles Chart is one of many music charts compiled by the Official Charts Company that calculates the best-selling singles of the week in the United Kingdom. Before 2004, the chart was only based on the sales of physical singles. This list shows singles that peaked in the Top 10 of the UK Singles Chart during 1957, as well as singles which peaked in 1956 and 1958 but were in the top 10 in 1957. The entry date is when the single appeared in the top 10 for the first time (week ending, as published by the Official Charts Company, which is six days after the chart is announced).

Eighty singles were in the top ten in 1957. Eleven singles from 1956 remained in the top 10 for several weeks at the beginning of the year, while "All the Way"/"Chicago" by Frank Sinatra, "Let's Have a Ball" by Winifred Atwell, "My Special Angel" by Malcolm Vaughan and "Reet Petite (The Sweetest Girl in Town)" by Jackie Wilson were all released in 1957 but did not reach their peak until 1958. "Make It a Party" by Winifred Atwell, "Singing the Blues" by Guy Mitchell and "True Love" by Bing Crosby & Grace Kelly were the singles from 1956 to reach their peak in 1957. Twenty artists scored multiple entries in the top 10 in 1957. Andy Williams, The Everly Brothers, Little Richard, Paul Anka and Shirley Bassey were among the many artists who achieved their first UK charting top 10 single in 1957.

The 1956 Christmas number-one, "Just Walkin' in the Rain" by Johnnie Ray, remained at number-one for the first week of 1957. The first new number-one single of the year was "Singing the Blues" by Guy Mitchell. Overall, thirteen different singles peaked at number-one in 1957, with Guy Mitchell and Lonnie Donegan (2) having the joint most singles hit that position.

Background

Multiple entries
Eighty singles charted in the top 10 in 1957, with seventy-one singles reaching their peak this year. Six songs were recorded by several artists with each version reaching the top 10:

"Around the World" - Bing Crosby, Gracie Fields, Ronnie Hilton
"Cumberland Gap" - Lonnie Donegan, The Vipers Skiffle Group
"Don't You Rock Me Daddy-O" - Lonnie Donegan, The Vipers Skiffle Group
"Singing the Blues" - Guy Mitchell, Tommy Steele & the Steelmen
"The Banana Boat Song" - Harry Belafonte, Shirley Bassey (version known as "The Banana Boat Song")
"Wanderin' Eyes" - Charlie Gracie, Frankie Vaughan

Twenty artists scored multiple entries in the top 10 in 1957. Elvis Presley secured the record for most top 10 hits in 1957 with seven hit singles.

Paul Anka was one of a number of artists with two top-ten entries, including the number-one single "Diana". Bing Crosby, Malcolm Vaughan, Petula Clark, Tab Hunter and Winifred Atwell were among the other artists who had multiple top 10 entries in 1957.

Chart debuts
Twenty-seven artists achieved their first top 10 single in 1957, either as a lead or featured artist. Of these, five went on to record another hit single that year: Charlie Gracie, The Everly Brothers, Paul Anka, Tab Hunter and The Vipers Skiffle Group. Harry Belafonte, Little Richard and Tommy Steele and the Steelmen all had two other entries in their breakthrough year.

The following table (collapsed on desktop site) does not include acts who had previously charted as part of a group and secured their first top 10 solo single.

Songs from films
Original songs from various films entered the top 10 throughout the year. These included "The Girl Can't Help It" (from The Girl Can't Help It), "When I Fall in Love" (Istanbul), "Around the World" (Around the World in 80 Days), "Love Letters in the Sand" (Bernardine), "Island in the Sun" (Island in the Sun), "Tammy" (Tammy and the Bachelor) and "All the Way" & "Chicago" (The Joker Is Wild).

Additionally, "Friendly Persuasion (Thee I Love)" by Pat Boone was a cover of the title track for the 1956 film Friendly Persuasion. The original version of the song was nominated for Best Original Song at the 29th Academy Awards. Gene Autry's recording of "Blueberry Hill" - released by Fats Domino this year - had appeared in the 1941 film The Singing Hill. "When I Fall in Love" was first introduced in the 1952 film One Minute to Zero, when Jeri Southern had been the vocalist. "I'll Take You Home Again, Kathleen" was used in several films before 1957, including For the Love of Mary (1948) and Rio Grande (1950), prior to Slim Whitman taking it into the UK top 10.

Best-selling singles
Until 1970 there was no universally recognised year-end best-sellers list. However in 2011 the Official Charts Company released a list of the best-selling single of each year in chart history from 1952 to date. According to the list, "Diana" by Paul Anka is officially recorded as the biggest-selling single of 1957. "Diana" (2), "Mary's Boy Child" (3) "All Shook Up" (8) and "Love Letters in the Sand" (9) all ranked in the top 10 best-selling singles of the decade.

Top-ten singles
Key

Entries by artist

The following table shows artists who achieved two or more top 10 entries in 1957, including singles that reached their peak in 1956 or 1958. The figures include both main artists and featured artists. The total number of weeks an artist spent in the top ten in 1957 is also shown.

Notes

 "Reet Petite" reached its peak of number six on 9 January 1958 (week ending).
"Hound Dog" re-entered the top 10 at number 8 on 10 January 1957 (week ending) for 4 weeks and at number 10 on 14 February 1957 (week ending).
 "A Woman in Love" re-entered the top 10 at number 10 on 10 January 1957 (week ending).
 "Friendly Persuasion" re-entered the top 10 at number 10 on 28 March 1957 (week ending).
 "The Garden of Eden" re-entered the top 10 at number 10 on 4 April 1957 (week ending).
 "When I Fall in Love" re-entered the top 10 at number 9 on 16 May 1957 (week ending) for 11 weeks.
 "Mr. Wonderful" re-entered the top 10 at number 7 on 11 July 1957 (week ending).
 Bing Crosby's version of "Around the World" re-entered the top 10 at number 9 on 1 August 1957 (week ending) and at number 10 on 22 August 1957 (week ending).
 "(Let Me Be Your) Teddy Bear" re-entered the top 10 at number 9 on 31 October 1957 (week ending).
 "Love Letters in the Sand" is recorded as the best-selling single of the year by some sources but the Official Charts Company lists "Diana" as its best-seller.
 "Diana" re-entered the top 10 at number 10 on 9 January 1958 (week ending).
 "Water Water"/"A Handful of Songs" re-entered the top 10 at number 9 on 7 October 1957 (week ending).
 "Mary's Boy Child" re-entered the top 10 at number 10 on 25 December 1958 (week ending).
 Figure includes single that peaked in 1956.
 Figure includes single that first charted in 1956 but peaked in 1957.
 Figure includes single that peaked in 1958.

See also
1957 in British music
List of number-one singles from the 1950s (UK)

References
General

Specific

External links
1957 singles chart archive at the Official Charts Company (click on relevant week)

1957 record charts
1957
1957 in British music